Terry Hee Yong Kai (born 6 July 1995) is a Singaporean badminton player.  In mixed doubles with Jessica Tan, Hee won his first World Tour title at the 2022 India Open. They repeated their success at the 2022 Commonwealth Games.

Early life 
Hee was born in Singapore on 6 July 1995. He enrolled in the Singapore Sports School on a scholarship when he was 13 and began playing badminton professionally for Singapore in 2014, after going through the youth system at the Singapore Sports School (SBA)'s badminton academy.

Career

2014–2018: Early senior career
Hee won the mixed team bronze medal at the 2014 Commonwealth Games in Glasgow, Scotland. He was also part of the national team that won the men's team bronze medals at the 2015, 2017 and the 2019 Southeast Asian Games. He made his second appearance at the Commonwealth Games in Gold Coast 2018.

2022: Commonwealth Games success
Hee opened the 2022 season by winning the mixed doubles title at the India Open partnering Jessica Tan. The duo later captured their second World Tour title of the year by winning the Orléans Masters.

In May 2022, Hee competed at the 2021 Southeast Asian Games. He won the bronze medals in the men's team and doubles events.

At the 2022 Commonwealth Games in August, Hee was part of the Singaporean team who won the bronze medal in the mixed team events as the Singaporean team defeated England 3–0 at the bronze medal playoff. Hee had also competed at the individual mixed doubles event with his wife, Tan. They won a historic gold medal and Singapore's first Commonwealth Games badminton mixed doubles gold after beating England's Marcus Ellis and Lauren Smith in the final, with a score of 21–16, 21–15 in straight sets.

Personal life
Hee served his National Service (NS) from 2019 to 2021. He married fellow Singaporean shuttler Jessica Tan in October, 2021. They had often partnered at mixed doubles tournaments since the start of Hee's professional career. Their victory at the 2021 Czech Open, defeating Russians Lev Barinov and Anastasiia Boiarun, was their first tournament as a married duo.

Achievements

Commonwealth Games 
Mixed doubles

Southeast Asian Games 
Men's doubles

BWF World Tour (2 titles)
The BWF World Tour, which was announced on 19 March 2017 and implemented in 2018, is a series of elite badminton tournaments sanctioned by the Badminton World Federation (BWF). The BWF World Tours are divided into levels of World Tour Finals, Super 1000, Super 750, Super 500, Super 300 (part of the HSBC World Tour), and the BWF Tour Super 100.

Mixed doubles

BWF International Challenge/Series (10 titles, 5 runners-up) 
Men's doubles

Mixed doubles

  BWF International Challenge tournament
  BWF International Series tournament
  BWF Future Series tournament

References

External links 
 
 Terry Hee at Singapore Badminton Association

1995 births
Living people
Singaporean people of Chinese descent
Singaporean male badminton players
Singapore Sports School alumni
Badminton players at the 2014 Commonwealth Games
Badminton players at the 2018 Commonwealth Games
Badminton players at the 2022 Commonwealth Games
Commonwealth Games gold medallists for Singapore
Commonwealth Games bronze medallists for Singapore
Commonwealth Games medallists in badminton
Competitors at the 2015 Southeast Asian Games
Competitors at the 2017 Southeast Asian Games
Competitors at the 2019 Southeast Asian Games
Competitors at the 2021 Southeast Asian Games
Southeast Asian Games bronze medalists for Singapore
Southeast Asian Games medalists in badminton
Medallists at the 2014 Commonwealth Games
Medallists at the 2022 Commonwealth Games